Clinton Terrence Perren (born 22 February 1975 in Brisbane) is a former Australian first-class cricketer who played for Queensland. He was a right-handed middle order batsman.

Perren was a graduate of the Australian cricket academy in 1995 but had to wait until the 1998–99 season to make his first-class debut. He was named Pura Cup player of the Year in 2002–03 and was rewarded by being selected to play for Australia A against South Africa A. In the 2003–04 season, he added a record 369 with Stuart Law for the second wicket against Western Australia.
 
He played a major part in his state's record total in the 2005–06 Pura Cup final. Perren scored 173 as Queensland scored 6 for 900 declared. He added 329 with Shane Watson which is a fourth wicket record for the Bulls. It capped off a great season by Perren as he had earlier scored the fourth-highest score ever by a Queenslander at the Gabba. He made 224 against South Australia, opening the batting.

He has failed to convert his 50s into centuries in the one day format, and had a highest score of 99 for many seasons until his maiden ING Cup century in 2004–05 against Tasmania.

References

External links
 

1975 births
Living people
Australian cricketers
Queensland cricketers
Cheshire cricketers
Cricketers from Brisbane